Božo Petrović-Njegoš (1846−1929) was a Montenegrin vojvoda and politician.

After taking command of the Southern Army in the Montenegrin–Ottoman War of 1876–1878, he represented the Principality of Montenegro at the Congress of Berlin. He served as the head of government of Montenegro from 1879 to 1905.

Biography
Božo studied in Paris. He returned to Montenegro following his studies. As cousin of Prince Nikola, Božo served as heir apparent from 1860 to 1871, when Nikola's first son Danilo was born.

Božo was the commander of the Southern Army during the Montenegrin–Ottoman War of 1876–1878. He had great success in the Battles of Medun and Trijebač. However, in his memoirs, vojvoda Ilija Plamenac claims he was the de facto leader of the Southern Army as Božo was too young and inexperienced. After the war, Božo was the Montenegrin representative at the Congress of Berlin. He was a candidate for Prince of Bulgaria in 1879.

After the Congress, Božo served as head of government for more than 25 years. First as President of the Senate, and after that as President of the Council of State from 1879 to 1905. He retired from politics with the proclamation of the liberal 1905 Constitution of Montenegro. In 1915, he was made governor of Shkodër and Malësia following their occupation in World War I.

Božo was jailed in December 1918 during the events that led to the creation of Yugoslavia. He was arrested near Nikšić with his two younger brothers, general Đuro Petrović and former district councilor Marko Petrović. All three were interned in Podgorica. Božo and Marko were released after almost one year, and were later interned in Sarajevo. General Đuro was kept in Podgorica where he suffered from cataract.

He died in 1929 and is buried in the Church of St. Sava graveyard in Erakovići, near Cetinje.

References

External links

1846 births
1929 deaths
Montenegrin generals
Politicians from Cetinje
Petrović-Njegoš dynasty
Prime Ministers of Montenegro

People of the Principality of Montenegro
Burials at Serbian Orthodox monasteries and churches
Military personnel from Cetinje